The Senga are an ethnic tribe of Zambia, distinct from the Nsenga.

The Senga are a tribe who migrated from the southern part of present-day Congo DRC. They re-settled in the Luangwa valley amongst the Tumbuka speaking people. The language they speak though similar to Tumbuka is distinct and also shares a common strain with Bisa/Bemba.

Origins
What the Senga can tell of their past begins with migration to their present home perhaps three centuries ago. There is unanimous agreement that their former home was a place called Uluwa which all evidence suggests was in what now is known as Katanga. There is evidence to suggest that prior to this time the Senga had no separate identity but were part of a larger group.

Donald Fraser who visited part of Senga land in 1897 takes the view that the Senga are a composite tribe partly of Tumbuka and Partly of Bisa Origin. But Senga tradition maintains that they were a separate group who broke away from the same chief (possibly Mwata Yamvo) as the Bisa and Bemba but at a different time.  The Senga relate Passing through Bisa country – Led by Chibeza Kambombo, the leader of the main group in the migration who was given a young girl for a wife by one of the Bisa Chiefs. Because the woman he was with as his wife was not yet of Child bearing age. To safe guard his lineage he was given a woman to start having children with.

Politics
Among the Senga political hierarchy is senior chief, chief, group headman (headman over more than  one village) and the village headman.

Like all Senga chiefs the senior chief inherits his position. Unlike some of them he inherits from his maternal uncle (a matrilineal system).
The principal clans are Goma, Ng’uni, kumwenda, Nyirenda, Lungu, Zimba and Miti.
Headmen like the chiefs are said to be selected from members of the chiefs clan (Goma Clan for the senior chiefs area). Senior chiefs usually are headmen before being senior chiefs.

While these clans in Zambia are matrilineal in nature, the same tribes which are based in Malawi have a patrilineal lineage. The Nyirendas, Kumwendas, Lungus, Zimbas who migrated to Malawi have had a partineal system of chieftainship. The person who becomes a chief of the village is the first-born son or eldest son where a girl is the first born in the royal family. In Malawi, these tribes are found predominantly in the northern districts of Malawi. However some clans have moved to various other districts in recent years because of work.

Today the Senga reside in Chama district of Muchinga province under the leadership of Senior Chief Kambombo. Other Chiefs that are under Senior Chief Kambombo includes; Chief Chifunda, Chief Chikwa and Chief Tembwe. These together with Senior Chief Kambombo makes what we call Chama District in the current Zambia.

Ethnic groups in Zambia